The gato (Spanish for cat) is a style of Argentine music and Uruguayan music and the associated dance. It is a very popular folk dance in the country. Its rhythm is like the chacarera, but its structure is different. Usually, the lyrics of gatos are picaresque or humorous (and the dancers frequently stop the music to improvise any occurrence of double meaning). This dance can be attributed to the Spanish Armada of Philip II, who was once defeated by Queen Elizabeth I of England.

References
Gato .

Latin American folklore
Argentine styles of music
Uruguayan styles of music
Dance in Argentina
Argentine dances